Sweetheart is a British coming-of-age film written and directed by Marley Morrison in her feature film debut. It premiered at the 2021 Glasgow Film Festival, where it won the Audience Award. Distributed by Peccadillo Films, the film had a theatrical release on 24 September 2021.

Cast
Nell Barlow as AJ
Jo Hartley as Tina
Ella-Rae Smith as Isla
Sophia Di Martino as Lucy
Samuel Anderson as Steve
Tabitha Byron as Dana

Production
Principal photography took place in 2019, wrapping that October. The project received support from Film London's Microwave scheme.

Reception

Critical response
Rotten Tomatoes reported an approval rating of 100% based on 19 reviews, with an average rating of 7.3/10.

Awards and nominations

References

External links

2021 films
2021 LGBT-related films
British LGBT-related films
Films about vacationing
Films set in Dorset
2020s English-language films
2020s British films